Seppo Pyykkö (born 24 December 1955) is a retired Finnish footballer. Throughout his career he played for clubs in Finland, Germany and United States.

Honours

Finnish Footballer of the Year: 1979
Mestaruussarja: 1979

References

External links

1955 births
Living people
Finnish footballers
Finnish expatriate footballers
Association football midfielders
Oulun Palloseura players
Houston Summit players
Major Indoor Soccer League (1978–1992) players
KFC Uerdingen 05 players
Finland international footballers
Finnish expatriate sportspeople in the United States
Expatriate soccer players in the United States
Sportspeople from Oulu